The D class as they were known from 1913 was a fairly homogeneous group of torpedo boat destroyers (TBDs) built for the Royal Navy in the mid-1890s. They were all constructed to the individual designs of their builder, John I. Thornycroft & Company of Chiswick, to meet Admiralty specifications.

Classification
In 1913 the nine surviving "30 knotter" vessels with two funnels (all ten had been built by Thornycroft, but Ariel was lost before their renaming as D class) were retrospectively classified by the Admiralty as the D class to provide some system to the naming of HM destroyers. In the same way those with three funnels were classified as the C-class and those with four funnels as the B-class. All these vessels had a distinctive "turtleback" forecastle that was intended to clear water from the bow, but actually tended to dig the bow in to anything of a sea, resulting in a very wet conning position. They were better constructed than their A-class forebears (the "26 knotter" and "27 knotter" groups), but still were poor seaboats unable to reach top speed in anything but perfect conditions.

Design
Armament was one QF 12-pounder gun on a bandstand on the forecastle, five QF 6-pounder guns (two sided abreast the conning tower, two sided between the funnels and one on the quarterdeck) and two single tubes for 18-inch (450 mm) torpedoes.

Due to the successful development of their previous 26 and 27-knot torpedo boat destroyers, John I Thornycroft & Company developed their two funnel design for the 1894/1895 – 1897/1898 building programs. The ships were considered an incremental improvement to the previous 27-knot design of the 1893/94 program. This design would be used for all follow-on turtleback ships under the 30-knot specification. The 30-knot torpedo boat destroyers built by Thornycroft were referred to as two funnel – 30-knot ships and were not assigned a class name at the time.

They featured a large fore-bridge, mast halfway between bridge and fore funnel, turtleback cut-away bow, large round stern, both torpedo tubes on centerline aft of second funnel and two funnels. They had a Thornycroft stern with the rudder not visible. They had dual rudders which made them very responsive to the helm.

Ships
All ten of the D class were built by Thornycroft at Chiswick, in four batches.

First group (ordered 10 May 1895 under 1894–1895 programme);
Desperate
Fame
Foam
Mallard - ordered 30 May vice 10 May
Second group (ordered 23 January 1896 under 1895–1896 programme) - identical with the preceding group;
Angler
Ariel
Third group (ordered 21 April 1896 under 1896–1897 programme) - modified from the previous six vessels;
Coquette
Cygnet
Cynthia
Last group (ordered 7 September 1897 under 1897–1898 programme) - with slightly enhanced engine power;
Stag

Key dates and fates

Notes: (a) Desperate had a final run over the measured mile on 4 September 1896. Altogether, this vessel completed nine successive preliminary trials.

See also
B-class destroyer (1913)
C-class destroyer (1913)
A sister-ship built for the Imperial German Navy as flotilla leader for torpedo boats, called Torpedo-Divisionsboot.

Notes

Bibliography

 

 
Destroyer classes
Ship classes of the Royal Navy